The First Secretary of the Abkhaz regional branch of the Communist Party of the Soviet Union was the position of highest authority in the SSR Abkhazia (1921–1931) and the Abkhaz ASSR (1931–1991) in the Georgian SSR of the Soviet Union. The position was created on February 14, 1921, and abolished in 1991. The First Secretary was a de facto appointed position usually by the Politburo or the General Secretary himself.

List of First Secretaries of the Communist Party of Abkhazia

See also

Socialist Soviet Republic of Abkhazia
Abkhaz Autonomous Soviet Socialist Republic

Notes

Sources
WorldStatesmen.org

1921 establishments in Russia
1991 disestablishments in the Soviet Union
Regional Committees of the Communist Party of Georgia (Soviet Union)
Politics of Abkhazia
Political organizations based in Abkhazia